Markus Snøve Høiberg (born 6 June 1991) is a Norwegian curler from Oslo. He was born in Oppdal. He competed at the 2014 Winter Olympics in Sochi as the alternate for the Norwegian men's team. He won a gold medal at the 2014 World Men's Curling Championship as a member of the team.

Høiberg currently plays second for the Steffen Walstad rink on the World Curling Tour.

Personal life
Høiberg works as a financial risk analyst.

References

External links
 
 
 

1991 births
Living people
People from Oppdal
Curlers at the 2014 Winter Olympics
Curlers at the 2018 Winter Olympics
Norwegian male curlers
Olympic curlers of Norway
World curling champions
Sportspeople from Oslo
European curling champions
Universiade medalists in curling
Universiade bronze medalists for Norway
Competitors at the 2011 Winter Universiade
Curlers at the 2022 Winter Olympics
21st-century Norwegian people
Competitors at the 2017 Winter Universiade